Elachista radiantella is a moth of the family Elachistidae. It is found in the United States, where it has been recorded from the District of Columbia, Virginia, Ohio, Kentucky and Maine.

The wingspan is 5.5-6.4 mm. The forewings are dark brown with a faint golden luster. The markings are silvery with a golden and opalescent luster. The hindwings are brownish gray. Adults have been recorded on wing from June to July.

The larvae feed on Panicum species, including Panicum dichotomum and Panicum clandestinum. They mine the leaves of their host plant. The mine starts as a narrow thread. It then enlarges into a blotch with irregularly scattered frass.

References

radiantella
Moths described in 1922
Moths of North America